Alvaston (/ˈɒlvəstən/ or /ˈælvəstən/) is a village and ward of Derby, England. Alvaston is situated on the A6, three miles south-east of Derby city centre and probably owes its name to Allwald. It is bordered to the north by the wards of Derwent, Chaddesden and Spondon, to the west is the City Centre, to the south are Sinfin and Chellaston and to the east the district of South Derbyshire.

The village of Alvaston has existed since at least the eleventh century. Rapid expansion came in the second half of the 19th Century and in 1904 the electric tram replaced the horse-bus service and, with the advent of the motor car, London Road became the A6. It became part of Derby in the late twentieth century.

The smaller, neighbouring village of Boulton has been swallowed up by Alvaston, and Boulton is rarely referred to by name.

History 
The village is recorded in the Domesday Book of 1086. It expanded rapidly with the coming of improved public transport to Derby, and the arrival of the railways and associated employment in the mid nineteenth century. Alvaston was the terminus of a tram route, and later a trolleybus route, which ran along London Road.

Few of the buildings in Alvaston date from before this era. There are several parallel streets of terraced Victorian housing in the Crewton district, large Edwardian detached villas stringing out away from the village centre, 1930s semi-detached homes, and a large expanse of post-Second World War council housing.

Governance 
Alvaston is part of the Derby South (UK Parliament constituency) constituency for Westminster elections.

Geography 
Alvaston lies to the southeast of Derby city centre, bounded to the east by the A6 dual carriageway, and to the north by the River Derwent.

Two miles to the west lies the site of the Derby Canal, the nineteenth century township of Allenton, and the Osmaston Park Industrial Estate.  To the north-west on the A6 towards Derby, a small settlement of Victorian terraced homes forms Wilmorton. The Pride Park development, which includes the Derby County football stadium, is a short walk away.  To the north, the River Derwent flows from Derby towards its confluence with the River Trent. The long-established chemical works of Celenese(formally Accordis and Courtaulds) are the northern bank, towards Spondon.  To the east lies the open countryside of South Derbyshire and Elvaston Castle Country Park, a favourite place for picnics and lakeside walks.  To the south, Boulton Moor stretches towards Chellaston and Aston-on-Trent. Perched on the edge of the settlement, on Stocker Flat and overlooking Boulton Moor may be found a maze of 1970s–1980s-built culs-de-sac and footpaths, leading to council and privately built homes.

Demography 
At the 2011 census the population of Alvaston was 16,255 and is made up of approximately 50% females and 50% males. The average age of people in Alvaston is 37 (2011 Census). 87.5% of people living in Alvaston were born in England. Other top answers for country of birth were 1.1% Scotland, 0.9% India, 0.8% Ireland, 0.6% Jamaica, 0.5% Pakistan, 0.5% Philippines, 0.5% Northern Ireland, 0.5% Wales, 0.4% Zimbabwe. (2011 Census) 93.6% of people living in Alvaston speak English. The other top languages spoken are 1.6% Polish, 0.4% Panjabi, 0.4% Urdu, 0.4% Tagalog/Filipino, 0.3% Russian, 0.3% Czech, 0.2% Kurdish, 0.2% Latvian, 0.2% Italian. (2011 Census) The religious make up of Alvaston is 53.6% Christian, 34.0% No religion, 2.5% Muslim, 1.2% Sikh, 0.4% Hindu, 0.3% Buddhist, 0.1% Jewish. (2011 Census)

Economy 
Alvaston is mainly residential. The main shopping centre of Alvaston can be found at the junction of the A6 London Road and the A5111 Derby Ring Road. Alvaston shopping centre holds a small number of chain and independent shops, including a men's barbers, two card shops, Michael's Drink Store, BP and Iceland.
In recent years a lot of independent shops have closed down and have been replaced with many takeaways.

Culture and community 
Pubs include the Blue Peter, Needles, Lodge, Silver Ghost, Cornishman, Brackens, Blue Jay and Coronation. There are doctors surgeries on Boulton Lane, Keldhome Lane and London Road, and dentists on Coleman Street, Raynesway and two on London Road. The main parks are Alvaston Park, Keldholme Lane Park and Kiwi Park.

Alvaston Park is a picturesque, riverside park covering 85 acres. As well as the sports facilities mentioned below, it has a lake with fishing and a model boat club, a science garden, play area and a new café. The park opened to the public in 1913 after William Curzon of Breedon Hall made some of his land available. It was landscaped by William Barron and Son of Borrowash – a firm founded by the young Scotsman who laid out the park at Elvaston Castle for Lord Harrington in 1830. A five-acre lake was added in 1923 but in 1934 it was found to be badly polluted and the town council had to urgently clear Cotton Brook to restore the water purity of the lake in time for the carnival. During the Second World War the park was used as a prisoner of war camp, part of which was for Germans and the other for Italians. The Italians worked in the fields of local farmers and the Germans worked at the ordnance depot on Sinfin Lane. A further 61.8 acres was added after the Second World War for use as playing fields.

Landmarks 

Aside from the church, listed buildings in the village include Church Farm and its associated cottages on Church Street, which date to the early 16th or early 17th-century. There is another Grade II farmhouse dating from the 18th century on Boulton Lane. The Poplars, in Ellastone Gardens, is a Grade II-listed Georgian building with an iron shield of arms on the side elevation.

Transport

Bus routes
ARRIVA – 1, 1A, 1C – Derby – Alvaston Circular including Pride Park
ARRIVA – 4, 4A – Derby – Alvaston – Allenton Circular
KINCHBUS – skylink – Derby – Alvaston – East Midlands Airport – Loughborough – Leicester

Education 
Alvaston has two secondary schools: Noel-Baker Academy and Alvaston Moor Academy. The suburb has several primary schools, Wyndham Primary Academy, notably Alvaston Junior Community School (AJCS), St John Fisher and Oakwood infant and junior school.

Religious sites 
There are several churches, of Anglican, Baptist, Methodist, United Reformed and Roman Catholic denominations.

There are two Anglican churches: St Michael and All Angels' Church is at the heart of the old village of Alvaston, serving the ecclesiastical parish of Alvaston, which includes Boulton Moor; and Boulton St. Mary's Church which is thought to be of Norman origin.

Sport and recreation
There are recreation grounds on Field Lane and Elvaston Lane.

Alvaston & Boulton Cricket Club (est. 1857) is an English amateur cricket club that is based on the Raygar Ground, on the Raynesway bypass. Alvaston & Boulton have 4 Saturday senior XI teams that compete in the Derbyshire County Cricket League, and they became Premier league champions in 2000. The club have a mixed Development Team which takes part in the Derbyshire Cricket Foundation Competitions which are run by the club and a Womens team. Their junior section play competitive cricket in the Derby and District Youth League.

Charlie Keetley scored 80 goals for the football club in the 1926–27 season, before going on to play for Leeds and Bradford. Alvaston Park has a National Standard BMX track, which has hosted regional and national race meetings, as well as pitches and a skateboard park and adiZone outdoor gym. On 7 December 2009 the deputy mayor of Derby Councillor Fareed Hussain opened an outdoor gymnasium called the AdiZone and new changing rooms were opened on 2 May 2011.

Since 25 May 2019 Alvaston Park has hosted a weekly 5 km Parkrun.

Climate

Notable people 

Mark Hateley, an England international footballer
Tony Hateley, a footballer who was Chelsea's record signing in 1966 and father of Mark
Craig Ramage, an Ex England U21 footballer who played for Derby County
Jordon Mutch, an England U21 footballer who plays for Crystal Palace
Jack O'Connell, an actor who has appeared in This Is England (2006), Skins (2009–10), and Unbroken (2014)
 Steve Elliott, an England U21 footballer who played for  Derby County

Notes

External links

References

External links

 
 

Areas of Derby
Wards of Derby